Gummer and Ford was an architectural firm founded in 1923 in Auckland, New Zealand, by William Gummer and Charles Reginald Ford. It was among the country's best-regarded architectural firm of the first half of the 20th century, designing numerous iconic buildings, including the former National Art Gallery and Dominion Museum in Wellington and the old Auckland Railway Station. Eighteen of the company's buildings have been registered as significant historic places by Heritage New Zealand. In 2006 an exhibition of their work was staged at The University of Auckland's Gus Fisher Gallery, and in 2007 the firm was described as 'the best architectural practice of all time in New Zealand'.

When the partnership was established, Gummer was already a highly successful architect. In his early 20s he had travelled to England and there worked for Leonard Stokes and Edwin Lutyens. The latter architect, later known mostly for his memorial designs, 'profoundly influenced' Gummer He was placed third in a 1911 competition to design Parliament Buildings in London. After returning to New Zealand in 1914 he designed several well-regarded buildings including the New Zealand Insurance office in Auckland and the State Fire Insurance building in Wellington.

The partnership between the two men was highly productive. Gummer's biographer in the Dictionary of New Zealand Biography attributes this to their complementary skills and personalities. Ford concentrated primarily on managing the practice and dealing with clients, although he also did some design work. Amongst the firm's early successes were Auckland's Dilworth Building, and the Auckland Railway Station, awarded a New Zealand Institute of Architects (NZIA) gold medal in 1931. The firm had earlier won a gold medal for the Remuera Public Library in 1928.

Gummer and Ford designed numerous war memorials, including the New Zealand National War Memorial in Wellington, the Christchurch Bridge of Remembrance and the Dunedin Cenotaph. Gummer's school buildings include St Peter's College, Auckland (1939). They designed the Massey Memorial.

Gummer was responsible for virtually all of the firm's iconic buildings but Ford also contributed significantly to New Zealand architecture and building through his book Earthquakes and Building Construction. He was also influential in the establishment of earthquake safety standards in New Zealand after the 1931 Hawke's Bay earthquake, and the establishment of a Chair of Architecture at Auckland University.

Both Gummer and Ford were at various times president of the NZIA.

List of notable works

Sources
 John Stacpoole, Opening address for 'Past Present: The Visionary Architecture of Gummer and Ford', at the Gus Fisher Gallery, 14 July 2006.
 Ian J. Lochhead, 'Gummer, William Henry' in the Dictionary of New Zealand Biography.
 PJD Waite, 'Safe as Houses', Heritage New Zealand, Summer 2005. Mostly about C. Reginald Ford.
 University of Auckland's Architecture Archive – BLOCK Building Tour of Gummer and Ford buildings in Auckland

References

Architecture firms of New Zealand
Companies based in Auckland
New Zealand companies established in 1923
Recipients of the NZIA Gold Medal
Design companies established in 1923